10 is the fifth studio album by Scottish pop-rock quartet Wet Wet Wet. Released on 31 March 1997, the album marked a decade since the release of the band's debut album, Popped in Souled Out.

Notably, 10 was the last studio album to be released by the band before their initial split in 1997. The album spawned three singles: "If I Never See You Again", "Strange", and the double A-side "Yesterday/Maybe I'm in Love", of which "Yesterday" only appeared on the 10 Again and 1998 re-issues of the album. The album reached #2 on the UK Albums Chart.

Track listings

Charts

Certifications

References

1997 albums
Wet Wet Wet albums
Mercury Records albums